Louisiana's 28th State Senate district is one of 39 districts in the Louisiana State Senate. It has been represented by Republican Heather Cloud since 2020, succeeding term-limited Democrat Eric LaFleur.

Geography
District 28 covers all of Allen and Evangelina Parishes and parts of Acadia, Avoyelles, and St. Landry Parishes, including some or all of Kinder, Oakdale, Ville Platte, Mamou, Eunice, Bunkie, Cottonport, Marksville, and Simmesport. 

The district overlaps with Louisiana's 3rd, 4th, and 5th congressional districts, and with the 28th, 32nd, 38th, 40th, and 41st districts of the Louisiana House of Representatives.

Recent election results
Louisiana uses a jungle primary system. If no candidate receives 50% in the first round of voting, when all candidates appear on the same ballot regardless of party, the top-two finishers advance to a runoff election.

2019

2015

2011

Federal and statewide results in District 28

References

Louisiana State Senate districts
Acadia Parish, Louisiana
Allen Parish, Louisiana
Avoyelles Parish, Louisiana
Evangeline Parish, Louisiana
St. Landry Parish, Louisiana